Millsite Lake is located by Chapel Corners, New York. The water from adjacent Sixberry Lake flows into Millsite Lake. Fish species present in the lake are northern pike, largemouth bass, smallmouth bass, lake trout, landlocked salmon, walleye, yellow perch, rock bass, and bluegill. There is a state owned beach launch on the lake off Cottage Hill Road.

See also
Camp Tousey

References 

Lakes of Jefferson County, New York